Robert "Bobby" Glennie (born 2 October 1957) is a Scottish former footballer, who played for Aberdeen, Dundee, Raith Rovers, Forfar Athletic, Arbroath and Elgin City. He made over 300 league appearances for Dundee and played in the 1980 Scottish League Cup Final defeat by Dundee derby rivals Dundee United.

Glennie was appointed as player-manager of Forfar in 1989. Despite successfully avoiding relegation, he was dismissed by the club in July 1990 as they had decided to bring in Paul Hegarty as their first ever full-time manager.

Personal life

On Friday 17 June 2011, Glennie was arrested after being caught two and a half times the drink drive limit. Police, who had been tipped off anonymously that Glennie may drive, pulled him over yards away from the pub in Dundee's Kinghorne Road. After spending the whole weekend in custody, he was fined £600 and banned for 20 months. Glennie's current occupation was given in court as a fork lift truck driver.

References

External links 
 

1957 births
Living people
Footballers from Dundee
Association football central defenders
Scottish footballers
Aberdeen F.C. players
Dundee F.C. players
Raith Rovers F.C. players
Forfar Athletic F.C. players
Arbroath F.C. players
Elgin City F.C. players
Forfar Athletic F.C. managers
Scottish Football League players
Scottish football managers
Scottish Football League managers